Ain't That Good News may refer to:

Ain't That Good News (album), a 1964 album by Sam Cooke
"Ain't That Good News" (song), a song by Sam Cooke from the album of the same name